The South China Tigers is a professional rugby union team from Hong Kong that plays in the Global Rapid Rugby competition.

The team was launched in 2018 to participate in the inaugural Global Rapid Rugby season.

For the naming of the team, South China tigers are considered as the most distinctive of all tiger subspecies. The population once numbered more than 4,000 in the wild, distributed from Hunan, Jiangxi in the north to as far south as Hong Kong.

History
The inaugural Global Rapid Rugby season was played as a showcase series in 2019, with the South China Tigers playing four matches in the Asia Showcase. In the first Rapid Rugby match, Glyn Hughes scored the Tigers' first try in the ninth minute against the Western Force in Perth on 29 March 2019. The team secured their first Rapid Rugby victory a month later in a home match against the Asia Pacific Dragons, winning 29–19 at the Aberdeen Sports Ground.

Players and personnel

Squad
The squad for the 2020 season includes:

Staff
Appointments for the 2019 season:

Records

Season standings
Global Rapid Rugby

Notes:
 2019 Rapid Rugby matches in the Asia showcase.

Head coaches
 Craig Hammond (2019–present)

Captains
 Liam Slatem and James Cunningham (2019)
 Liam Slatem and Josh Dowsing (2020)

See also

Rugby union in Hong Kong
Hong Kong national rugby union team

References

External links
 
 HKRU website

 
Sports teams in Hong Kong
Rugby union in Hong Kong
2018 establishments in Hong Kong
Rugby clubs established in 2018
Rugby union clubs disestablished in 2020
2020 disestablishments in Hong Kong